Odyssey: The Search for Ulysses is a video game released in 2000, developed by In Utero and Cryo Interactive.

Development 
The game uses the Cryogen engine, with characters who are able to move in real time 3D, in a pre-rendered environment.

Plot 
The game's universe stays faithful to Homer's the Odyssey, including its characters, Poseidon, Zeus, Cerberus and the Cyclops. Penelope, who has had no news of Ulysses for many years, requests that Heritias set off in search of his childhood friend. Heritias first goes to Troy, the last place the leader of the Achaean troops was seen. In the game, the player has to fight creatures like the Gorgon and the Cyclops and you will have to foil the manipulation of the gods to escape from the conspiracy of Poseidon's agents, and resist the seductive enchantress.

Critical reception

The game has a Metacritic rating of 58% based on 7 critic reviews.

GameSpot said " Though its problems might be frustrating at first, once you settle into the game, you'll be in for a suitably rewarding adventure. " Electric Playground said " A good mythological storyline goes a long way towards making a sometimes-frustrating game a whole lot of fun. " Eurogamer said " The game looks and sounds excellent, but is let down badly by simplistic puzzles, fussy location routes, and it's [sic] essentially linear nature. " IGN said " By the time I had spent a few days wandering around the world of Odyssey, I was sure I never wanted to return. " Gamezone said " It’s not revolutionary, nor is it total garbage, but it is hard. " Quandary said " My first impressions were not good. Having worked my way through a confusing set of options screens, I was confronted by the game interface. Fifteen minutes later I was ready to quit. " All Game Guide said " An awkward interface, combined with a limited plot, makes for an unfulfilling rote adventure. "

Just Adventure said "If you have ever wanted to captain a flying ship, be a passenger in Charon's sloop, or be tested by Poseidon, then Odyssey is a must-have for your adventure collection. Now if you will excuse me, after conquering the combined malicious and devious forces of gods and monsters alike, I feel I deserve some R&R. If I can only remember where I earlier encountered that charming young "lady."" Adrenaline Vault said "Despite dated graphics, a rather clumsy interface, and gameplay that is confusing at times, Odyssey manages to emerge as a playable title. The strength of the story, richness of its environments, and mythic characters allow the game to surpass its flaws at times, bringing the feel of Heritias’ epic quest to life. Fans of the adventure genre or Greek mythology will find a lot to enjoy here, but others may not be willing to look past Odyssey‘s handful of troubling issues." UHS said "I'm sure there are people out there who will like Odyssey: The Search for Ulysses. I just happen not to be one of them. Although Odyssey tells a decent story, I didn't think it was much fun to play -- a poor interface and too many puzzles that kill your character for a wrong choice make this the kind of game that can easily try your patience."

References

External links 
 Odyssey: The Search for Ulysses at Microïds
 Odyssey: The Search for Ulysses at Mobygames

2000 video games
Adventure games
Cryo Interactive games
Microïds games
Video games developed in France
Windows games
Windows-only games
Works based on the Odyssey
Video games based on works by Homer